Lynnette D'anna (born 1955 as Lynnette Dueck) is a Canadian writer, and the author of five novels. Canadian literature

Biography
D'anna was born in Steinbach, Manitoba and currently resides in Winnipeg. She was a finalist for the John Hirsch Most Promising Manitoba Writer Award in 1992 following the publication of her first novel, sing me no more, published by Press Gang Publishers using the author's birth surname Lynnette Dueck. Her second novel, RagTimeBone, a coming-of-age story for young adults published by New Star Books, is also available in German, translated and published as Zeit der Blöße by  Argument Verlag (Hamburg) in 2000.

Her first three books—sing me no more, RagTimeBone and fool's bells—form a thematic trilogy. Belly Fruit, an erotic murder-mystery published by New Star Books in 2000, is a farcical examination of contemporary relationships. Vixen, published in 2001 by Insomniac Press, explores the themes of memory and censorship. D'anna wrote "Captain Don Murray: Highliner & Adventurer," a privately commissioned biography, published in 2008.

D'anna is a graduate of creative communications with a journalism major. She was a regular contributor to Zygote magazine, a feature books page columnist at Interchange, and has contributed to a large number of literary journals and newspapers during the course of her career. As managing editor of the Canadian Women's Health Network Magazine, she facilitated the production of two special issues on Diversity and Women's Health.

She is past-president of Prairie Fire Press board of directors, past mentor to emerging writers in the Manitoba Writers Guild Mentor Program, and awards jurist for the Manitoba Arts Council. Over the course of her writing career, her work has been recognized with awards from the Canada Council for the Arts, the B.C. Arts Council and the Manitoba Arts Council.

D'anna is considered an important figure in Queer Mennonite literature and has been described by Daniel Shank Cruz as "the godmother of queer Mennonite literature."

Bibliography
 sing me no more, Press Gang Publishers, 1992
 RagTimeBone, New Star Books, 1994
 fool's bells''', Insomniac Press, 1999
 Belly Fruit, New Star Books, 2000
 Zeit der Blöße, Argument Verlag, Hamburg 2000
 vixen, Insomniac Press, 2001
 Captain Don Murray: Highliner & Adventurer" Commissioned Biography, 2008

Awards
 Manitoba Community Newspapers Association Student Journalism Award, 1991–1992
 Winnipeg Press Club Student Journalism Award, 1991–1992
 Finalist, John Hirsch Most Promising Manitoba Writer Award, 1992
 Listed Who's Who of Canadian Women, 1997-98.

References

External links
 Library and Archives Canada
 FiledBy Author Lynnette D'anna
 Manitoba Author Profile
 Insomniac Press Author Profile
 Open Library
 ABC Book World Author Profile
 Giessener Elektronische Bibliothek: Julia Michael, Narrating communities: constructing and challenging Mennonite Canadian identities through narrative, thesis Universität Gießen 2017, therein Linguistic, Narrative, and Contextual Disruptions in Lynnette D'anna's Novel "Vixen", pp 187 – 198

1955 births
Canadian women novelists
Canadian Mennonites
LGBT Mennonites
Living people
Writers from Toronto
Mennonite writers
20th-century Canadian novelists
21st-century Canadian novelists
20th-century Canadian women writers
21st-century Canadian women writers
Writers from Steinbach, Manitoba